MITES, or Minority Introduction to Engineering and Science, is a highly selective six-week summer program for rising high school seniors held at the Massachusetts Institute of Technology. Its purpose is to expose students from underserved and underrepresented backgrounds to the fields of science and engineering. The program also aims to foster an interest in these subject matters and prepare students for the pressures and lifestyle of college life.

History
MITES was founded in 1974 as the MITE (Minority Introduction to Engineering) Program with the purpose of increasing the number of people from underrepresented backgrounds in the engineering profession. It started out as a two-week intensive program, and later evolved into what is now a six-week program for 60-80 students.

Eligibility Requirements
To be eligible to apply to MITES, applicants must be:

U.S. citizens or permanent residents
High school juniors or equivalent

Students from all racial and ethnic backgrounds can apply to the MITES Program.

Curriculum
Students take four core classes all six weeks from the following choices:
 Biology/Biochemistry/Chemistry
 Calculus I/Calculus II
 Physics I/Physics II/Physics III
 Humanities

Also, they take one of five electives:
 Architecture - Students learn the concepts of folding, design, and architecture in order to build full-scale models of structures they design at the end of the program.
 Electronics - Students learn the elements of Electronics using a breadboard and create a functioning demonstration of an electrical concept at the end of the program.
 Genomics - Students research DNA and genetic diseases at the Broad Institute, where one third of the human genome was sequenced.
 Engineering Design - Students team up to build robots for specific tasks and compete against each other at the end of the program.
 Digital Design - Students learn computer skills applicable to designing web pages and working toward a final project.

Student life
MITES students live at Simmons Hall, on Vassar Street. Simmons Hall is an undergrad dorm designed in an unconventional style which resembles a giant sponge. They enjoy full use of the facilities at MIT such as the student center and the libraries. Also, students get to know the cities of Boston and Cambridge.

The students also participate in activities such as a Fourth of July barbecue, a tour of Boston, lab tours, a talent show, a college fair, and a variety of speaker's luncheons with people such as the Dean of Science at MIT and Eric Lander.

College Matriculation
Over 2,000 MITES alumni have taken part in the program over the past 41 years. Nearly 30% of MITES alumni have matriculated to MIT. Those MITES students who attend MIT are consistently strong performers. Since its inception, the graduation rate of MITES alumni at MIT is as much as 12 percentage points higher than that of minority students who did not have the privilege of attending MITES.

References
Official MITES Website

Massachusetts Institute of Technology